Aslantepe Tumulus , also spelled as Arslantepe, is a 5,000 year-old tumulus located in Malatya Province, Eastern Anatolia Region of Turkey. The unearthed king's palace is an open-air museum, while the artifacts are exhibited in Malatya Museum.

It dates back  to Chalcolithic period and late Hittite period. Excavations started in 1932, and carried out by Italian archaeologists.

See also
Melid

References

Tumuli in Turkey
Archaeological sites in Eastern Anatolia
Open-air museums in Turkey
Tourist attractions in Malatya Province